Ashwamedh Devi (born 18 September 1967) is a politician and a Member of Parliament  elected from the Ujiarpur constituency in the Indian state of Bihar being a Janata Dal (United) candidate.

Early life
Ashwamedh was born on 18 September 1967 in Meyari, district Samastipur (Bihar). She married Pradip Mahto on 7 May 1979 and has four sons.

Education
Ashwamedh Devi is Matriculate, Bajitpur Meyari, Sarai Ranjan, Samastipur, Bihar.

Career
She was elected as a member of Bihar Vidhan Sabha in 2000.  She remained as a member till 2009. In the year 2009, she was elected as a member of the 15th Lok Sabha.

References

Janata Dal (United) politicians
Articles created or expanded during Women's History Month (India) - 2014
Living people
1967 births
India MPs 2009–2014
Lok Sabha members from Bihar
Women members of the Bihar Legislative Assembly
21st-century Indian women politicians
21st-century Indian politicians
Women members of the Lok Sabha
Bihar MLAs 2000–2005
Bihar MLAs 2005–2010
20th-century Indian women
20th-century Indian people